Mathurina is a monotypic genus of flowering plants belonging to the family Passifloraceae. The only species is Mathurina penduliflora.

M. penduliflora is a tree native to the Rodrigues Island. It grows 4 - 12 meter talls, young leaves are linear, mature leaves are obovate, and it has white hairless homostylous flowers. Heterophylly has been recorded in the genus. 

Isolation of tetraphyllin B and volkenin from M. penduliflora support its classification as a member of Turneroideae.

References

Passifloraceae
Monotypic Malpighiales genera